Bertil Wedin (21 November 1940 – 4 March 2022) was a Swedish secret service agent. He was accused in an English court, but acquitted of the 1982 burglary of the Pan Africanist Congress (PAC) office in London. In 1996, Wedin was named as a suspect in the assassination of Sweden's prime minister, Olof Palme, but has denied any involvement. His accuser, Peter Caselton – who with eight others including Craig Williamson had applied for amnesty from South Africa's Truth and Reconciliation Commission for the March 1982 bombing of the ANC office in London – was allegedly a member of an apartheid South Africa assassination squad. He was also suspected of bombing the ANC Stockholm office in 1986. Wedin denies involvement in any crimes.

Wedin had been a resident of Kyrenia in Northern Cyprus from 1985 until his death on 4 March 2022.

References

External links

Naming Bertil Wedin
Announcement of death

Living people
1940 births
Swedish expatriates in Cyprus
People from  Kyrenia